Festival Republic  is a UK music promoter. It was founded as Mean Fiddler Group in 1982 by Irish-born chairman John Vincent Power, as a venue-management and music-promotion group. After the group was taken over by Hamsard Ltd in 2005, the focus became more concentrated on festivals, and in 2007 the venues along with the Mean Fiddler name were sold on, with the remaining company being renamed Festival Republic. Melvin Benn is the current managing director.

History

The group was founded in 1982 by Irish-born chairman John Vincent Power, with a venue called simply Mean Fiddler. At the end of the 1980s they took control of the Reading Festival from Harold Pendleton, beginning a move into festivals. After acquiring the LA2 in Charing Cross Road in 2000, they were renamed to become the Mean Fiddler Music Group.

In April 2005, they accepted a takeover bid from Hamsard Ltd, a co-operative company 50.1% owned by Live Nation UK (formerly the entertainment division of Clear Channel UK but now part of Live Nation International) and 49.9% owned by Irish event organiser MCD.

In 2006, the Mean Fiddler Music Group reduced its touring and promotion activities to concentrate on running festivals. It maintained control of the Reading and Leeds festivals and announced a new addition, Latitude Festival.

In 2007, the Mean Fiddler Music Group was sold along with several venues to Mama Group Plc in order to allow Festival Republic to concentrate fully on promoting festivals.  As part of the sale, Mama Group acquired the rights to the Mean Fiddler trademark.

Festival promotion and production

Festival Republic's flagship events are the Reading and Leeds Festivals. These are a pair of annual events which take place simultaneously on the Friday, Saturday and Sunday of the August bank holiday weekend, sharing the same bill. In addition they also run the Latitude Festival in Suffolk, the Wireless Festival and the Community Festival in London, EDC UK in Milton Keynes, and the Download Festival in Leicestershire. They also produce a BBC Proms In The Park and BBC Radio 2 Live In Hyde Park, which both take place on the same weekend in September in London's Hyde Park.

In Ireland, they organise the Longitude Festival and Electric Picnic. In Norway, they run the Hove Festival. In Germany they have expanded from running the Berlin Festival to running the first European Lollapalooza.

They have previously been responsible for Big Chill festival, which last ran in 2011, and were the operators of the Glastonbury Festival from 2002 until 2012.

Former festivals 

 Big Chill Festival (2010–2011)
 Eroica (2018 formerly V Festival South)
 V Festivals (2017) 
 T in the Park (2016)

Former venues

London Astoria
London Forum
Mean Fiddler
Jazz Café
The Garage
The Borderline
The Grand
The Old Fiddler
The Crossbar
The Complex
Media
Point 101
Powers Bar
Ion Bar
Bartok
The Z Bar

References

External links 
 official site

1982 establishments in the United Kingdom
Hotel and leisure companies of the United Kingdom
Glastonbury Festival
Live Nation Entertainment
Festival organizations